In mathematics and other formal sciences, first-order or first order most often means either:
 "linear" (a polynomial of degree at most one), as in first-order approximation and other calculus uses, where it is contrasted with "polynomials of higher degree", or
 "without self-reference", as in first-order logic and other logic uses, where it is contrasted with "allowing some self-reference" (higher-order logic)

In detail, it may refer to:

Mathematics 
 First-order approximation
 First-order arithmetic
 First-order condition
 First-order hold, a mathematical model of the practical reconstruction of sampled signals
 First-order inclusion probability
 First Order Inductive Learner, a rule-based learning algorithm
 First-order reduction, a very weak type of reduction between two computational problems
 First-order resolution
 First-order stochastic dominance
 First order stream

Differential equations 
 Exact first-order ordinary differential equation
 First-order differential equation
 First-order differential operator
 First-order linear differential equation
 First-order non-singular perturbation theory
 First-order partial differential equation, a partial differential equation that involves only first derivatives of the unknown function of n variables
 Order of accuracy

Logic 
 First-order language
 First-order logic, a formal logical system used in mathematics, philosophy, linguistics, and computer science
 First-order predicate, a predicate that takes only individual(s) constants or variables as argument(s)
 First-order predicate calculus
 First-order theorem provers
 First-order theory
 Monadic first-order logic

Chemistry 
 First-order fluid, another name for a power-law fluid with exponential dependence of viscosity on temperature
 First-order reaction a first-order chemical reaction
 First-order transition

Computer science 
 First-order abstract syntax
 First-order function
 First-order query

Other uses 
 First-order desire
 First-order election, in political science, the relative importance of certain elections
 First order Fresnel lens

See also

 First Order (disambiguation)
 Original order, the first ordering
 First (disambiguation)
 Order (disambiguation)